Pruthi is a surname, mainly in the Punjab region. It is held by Hindus and Sikhs of the Arora Khatri communities. It means descendant of Puru/Purushotama/Porus.

Notable people 

 Hem Singh Pruthi

References

Indian surnames
Punjabi-language surnames
Arora clans
Surnames of Indian origin
Hindu surnames
Khatri clans
Khatri surnames